Hassi Zahana (formerly known as Tassin during The French Empire) is a small town and commune in Sidi Bel Abbès Province in northwestern Algeria.

Located in the countryside, the town is heavily surrounded by farms and large fields consisting mostly of wheat and olive trees.

The town was originally named after Mr.Tassin who stopped at the stagecoach relay of Hassi-Zehana in 1883.

History 
In 1883, a French official, Mr. Tassin, director of civil affairs for Admiral de Gueydon traveling from Tlemcen to Sidi-Bel-Abbès, stopped at the stagecoach relay at Hassi-Zehana "Auberge du Roulage". This then included only a well dug by engineering, at the time of the conquest of 1830, a Moorish cafe (modest hut of brushwood) and "L'Auberge du roulage", the only European construction of the place.

Colonization center 
Having noticed the magnificent plain surrounding the site, the official informed the Governor of Algeria of his discovery. The following year, he took the decision to install a colonization center there which soon took the name of Tassin.

The land was bought from the native owners and divided into 110 lots, of which 4 were granted to French people in Algeria and 65 to French people from mainland France from the Garonne, Massif Central and Rhône regions, including 9 Hermillon families.

Creation of the village

In Hermillon, a small mountain village, life was very rough at that time. Winter is endless, the harvest uncertain, life was difficult. In 1888, Mr. Serain the teacher, often listened to the complaints of these fellow citizens, when the inhabitants met at school in the evening after supper. The women talked about their household chores, the men asked the teacher for advice. They complained about their fate, lamented the climate, cursing the snow that covered the whole country, preventing them from picking up the grass essential for their dairy cows. "Why don't you go to Algeria?" one day the teacher told them. The idea took shape and one day in April 1889, Monsieur Serain and a resident of Hermillon set off in recognition of the other side of the Mediterranean. The concession requests having been accepted, 9 families from the village, 65 people (26 adults and 39 children) were designated for the settlement of Tassin. Leaving provisionally women and children, the men left on December 2, 1889. The teacher and his family joined them a few days later.

Arriving in a torrential rain, the newcomers had to stay in gourbis and wooden huts. The following January, the Savoyards began to build their dwellings: four large yellow walls with a frame covered with tiles and a chimney in a corner, 8 meters long by 5 meters wide and 3.5 meters high. A unique piece that served as a kitchen, living room and bedroom.

They organized a raising of chickens and dairy goats behind the houses. The surrounding land was made up of holm oaks, jujube trees, carob trees, wild olive trees, dwarf palm trees that had to be cleared. This work was carried out by experienced Spanish charcoal burners. A beautiful red clay-limestone soil appeared and cultivation began.

In 1895 TASSIN had become a fully-fledged commune and in 1900 there were over 200 houses there. In the main street shaded by plane trees, shops opened their doors and administrations began to set up. The 300 original settlers had become a thousand and among them there were 87 people from Hermillon.

Places of interest

Wine Factory (The cooperative cellar) 

Probably one of the well known places in town, the wine factory is an essential piece of town's history.This building is located near the west entrance.

The cooperative cellar was created in 1932. It had the particularity of being equipped with centrifugal pumps which allow handling from 300 to 400 hecto-hours. It was particularly designed to make quality wine, thanks to the variety of grape types brought by them. cooperative, local and fruity which were the specialties of the wine of the region. Its creation had allowed the storage and vinification of grapes belonging to winegrowers who did not have a personal cellar. Its capacity was 49,000 hectoliters. It is Mr. Gagnet, the winemaker and wine merchant, who since the foundation of the Cooperative has been handling the wines. The dedicated and competent Board of Directors is chaired by Mr. Granie.

Communes of Sidi Bel Abbès Province
Sidi Bel Abbès Province